Peter Chingoka (2 March 1954 – 22 August 2019) was a Zimbabwean cricket administrator.

Career 
His father, Douglas, was a sub-inspector in the Rhodesian police force—the British South Africa Police—and later a deputy commissioner in the Zimbabwe Republic Police from 1980.

As an all-rounder in 1970s Rhodesia, Chingoka was the first Black Rhodesian cricketer to play at a high level, appearing in List A games for the South Africa African XI, which he captained in two matches in the Gillette Cup competition in 1975-76 and 1976-77. His team lost both matches by large margins.

After a time in club cricket, Chingoka moved into administration and in 1990 became Vice-President of the Zimbabwe Cricket Union (now renamed Zimbabwe Cricket); he was promoted to the position of President two years later. As such he became a full voting member of the executive board of the International Cricket Council (ICC). He was elected chairman of the African Cricket Association (ACA) in 1998.

In October 2007, Chingoka, who was due to give evidence in Darrell Hair employment tribunal/racism controversy, was refused entry to Britain. In February 2008, the-then UK Culture Secretary Andy Burnham, refused to guarantee that Chingoka would be allowed entry to attend a London meeting of the ICC until a publication of a report by accountants KPMG on alleged corruption in Zimbabwean cricket.

He was added to the European Union's list of Zimbabweans subject to personal sanctions—a ban on travel to the EU and the freezing of any assets there—in July 2008, following the controversial 2008 presidential election, in which President Robert Mugabe was re-elected amidst serious political violence. Later, in December 2008, he was banned from travelling to Australia.

He resigned as the chairman of Zimbabwe cricket on 23 July 2014.

Death
Chingoka died in August 2022.

References

External links
 
 Players call for Chingoka and Bvute to quit from Cricinfo, 8 September 2005
 

Zimbabwean cricket administrators
Zimbabwean cricketers
2019 deaths
1954 births
Cricketers from Bulawayo